is a iaijutsu koryū founded by Hasegawa Chikaranosuke Eishin (or Hidenobu)(長谷川主税助英信) as a continuation of the teachings he received in Shinmei Musō-ryū. After the death of the eleventh headmaster, Ōguro Motoemon Kiyokatsu, the school split into two branches or ha. One branch, the Shimomura-ha (下村派), was renamed by its fourteenth headmaster Hosokawa Yoshimasa to Musō Shinden Eishin-ryū (無雙神傳英信流). After studying under Hosokawa, Nakayama Hakudō created his own school which he called Musō Shinden-ryū (夢想神伝流) in 1932.  The other branch, the Tanimura-ha (谷村派), was renamed Musō Jikiden Eishin-ryū during the Taishō era (1912-1926), by its seventeenth headmaster, Ōe Masaji, who incorporated the Shimomura-ha techniques and rationalized the curriculum.

Lineage
Here is the lineage of Hasegawa Eishin-ryū and its two branches up until Nakayama Hakudō and Ōe Masaji. Hayashi Masu no Jō Masanari, the twelfth headmaster as recognized by the Tanimura-ha, was a direct disciple of Matsuyoshi Teisuke Hisanari, the twelfth headmaster as recognized by the Shimomura-ha.

Jinsuke-Eishin mainline

Shimomura-ha

Tanimura-ha

Notes

References
 
 
 
 Watatani Kiyoshi, Yamada Tadashi (1978). Bugei Ryuha Daijiten (武芸流派大事典) (Large Encyclopedia of Martial Arts) (in Japanese). Shin Jinbutsu Ourai Sha (人物往来社).
 

Ko-ryū bujutsu
Japanese swordsmanship